First Baptist Church is an Evangelical Protestant church located in Ukiah, California. First Baptist is part of the American Baptist denomination. Founded nearly 150 years ago in 1859, the church has had three major upgrades to its facilities.

Ministers
Senior pastor Kevin Wood is originally from Eureka, California, although he spent most of his adult life in the Bay Area. He earned his Th.M. from Fuller Theological Seminary in Pasadena, California.

The pastor emeritus is William C. Duncan.

First Baptist Church Youth
First Baptist Church of Ukiah's youth gather weekly on Sunday mornings from 9:40 to 10:40, during the church's first Sunday-morning service.  Additionally, the youth gather on Wednesday evenings from 6:40 to 8:30 in a group called "TRUTH", which meets above New Life Preschool in a room called "The LOFT", located on the north end of First Baptist Church's gymnasium. The church offices are across the street in an old Victorian home.  All youth are welcome to these meetings, regardless of religious affiliation.

References

External links
 Official website

Baptist churches in California
Churches in Mendocino County, California
Religious organizations established in 1859
1859 establishments in California
Ukiah, California